SS Purdue Victory was a Victory ship built in the United States during World War II. She was named after Purdue University, West Lafayette, Indiana.

Construction
Purdue Victory was laid down on 11 February 1945, under a Maritime Commission (MARCOM) contract, MCV hull 740, by the Permanente Metals Corporation, Yard No. 2, Richmond, California; she was sponsored by Mrs. Paul N. Mulvany, the wife of the assistant chief of the Construction & Inspection section at the regional office of MARCOM, and was launched on 24 March 1945.

History
She was allocated to Waterman Steamship Corp., on 18 April 1945. On 14 December 1949, she was laid up in the National Defense Reserve Fleet, Mobile, Alabama.  She was reactivated 26 July 1950, and allocated to W. R. Chamberlin. On 21 March 1951, she was allocated to Pacific Far East Lines. On 21 April 1952, she was laid up in the Suisun Bay Reserve Fleet, Suisun Bay, California. She was again reactivated on 5 June 1966, for use by the Military Sea Transportation Service and allocated to Pacific Coast Transport Co. On 19 January 1970, she was laid up for the last time at Suisun Bay. On 5 February 1992, she was sold for scrapping to Mini Shipping and Trading Co., Ltd., for $350,000. She was removed from the fleet on 7 April 1992, with scrapping complete as of 15 December 1992.

References

Bibliography

 
 
 

 

Victory ships
Ships built in Richmond, California
1945 ships